Zihlathi Ndwandwe (a.k.a. Zilathi Nxumalo) (died 1975) was Ndlovukati (Queen mother) of Swaziland during the reign of Sobhuza II. She was succeeded by her full sister and co-wife, Seneleni Ndwandwe.

References

Swazi royalty
Year of birth missing
1975 deaths